Bajo Aragón, or Lower Aragon, is an administrative comarca in eastern central Aragon, Spain. It was first established in 1999. It has a population of 29,358 (2007) and an area of 1.304,2 km2. The seat of the comarca is in Alcañiz. It is located in Teruel Province, in the transitional area between the Iberian System and the Ebro Valley.

The municipalities of Aguaviva, Belmonte de San José, La Cañada de Verich, La Cerollera, La Codoñera, La Ginebrosa and Torrevelilla belong to the Catalan-speaking strip in eastern Aragon known as La Franja.

Historical region
The name Bajo Aragón, Lower Aragon, was already used before 1999 for a much larger area, a historical region now sometimes called Bajo Aragón histórico in order to differentiate it from the present-day administrative comarca.

Municipalities
The Catalan version of the names of the towns are in brackets.
 Aguaviva (Aiguaviva de Bergantes)
 Alcañiz
 Alcorisa
 Belmonte de San José (Bellmunt de Mesquí)
 Berge
 Calanda
 La Cañada de Verich (La Canyada de Beric)
 Castelserás
 La Cerollera (La Sorollera)
 La Codoñera (La Codonyera)
 Foz-Calanda
 La Ginebrosa
 Mas de las Matas
 La Mata de los Olmos
 Los Olmos
 Las Parras de Castellote
 Seno
 Torrecilla de Alcañiz
 Torrevelilla (La Torre de Vilella)
 Valdealgorfa

See also
Lower Aragon
Matarranya historical comarca
Comarcas of Aragon
La Franja

References

This article includes content from the Spanish Wikipedia article :es:Bajo Aragón.

Comarcas of Aragon
Geography of the Province of Teruel